Netherlands–Taiwan relations go back to the 1600s when the Dutch East India Company set up a colony on Taiwan.

Overview
Taiwan’s interests in the Netherlands are represented by the Taipei Representative Office in the Netherlands while Dutch interests in Taiwan are represented by the Netherlands Office Taipei.

History

From 1624 to 1662 and 1664 to 1668 the Dutch East India Company operated a colony on Taiwan. It was one of their most profitable colonies with 26% of the company's profits coming from their Taiwan operations in 1664. The Dutch East India Company were forced from their holdings by Koxinga and indigenous groups.

In the 1980s Taiwan ordered two submarines from a Dutch shipyard which were delivered despite tremendous Chinese pressure. China accused the Netherlands of colluding with American President Ronald Reagan and downgraded relations with the Netherlands as punishment and threatened to do the same to the US.

To punish the Netherlands for delivering the submarines China downgraded diplomatic relations. In 1984 the Netherlands agreed not to export additional military goods in order to restore relations.

In 2001 the Netherlands and Taiwan signed a double-taxation treaty.

In 2020 the Netherlands changed the name of their representative office in Taiwan from “Netherlands Trade and Investment” to “Netherlands Office Taipei.” This change was meant to reflect the actual scope of Netherlands–Taiwan relations beyond simply trade and investment. China reacted negatively to the change with the government threatening to cut off sales of medical supplies to the Netherlands during the COVID-19 pandemic.

In 2020 the Netherlands House of Representatives passed a motion supporting Taiwan’s participation in international organizations.

Foreign investment

The Dutch are considered to be Taiwan's first foreign investors due to their investments during the colonial period. In the modern era the Netherlands is Taiwan’s largest source of foreign direct investment (FDI). Dutch electronics company ASML has significant investments in Taiwan and their long term partnership with TSMC has allowed both of them to move to the head of their field. The Dutch electronics giant Philips was the largest initial investor in TSMC. Taiwanese FDI flows into the Netherlands are also significant.

See also
 Netherlands Office Taipei
 Taipei Representative Office in the Netherlands

References

Foreign relations of Taiwan
Foreign relations of the Netherlands
Relations of colonizer and former colony